Draco indochinensis, also known as the Indochinese flying lizard or Indochinese gliding lizard, is a species of agamid lizard endemic to South-east Asia (Cambodia and southern Vietnam).

Description
It has earlier been considered synonymous to or a subspecies of Draco blanfordii. However, phylogenetic data and other supporting morphological features indicate that it is a separate species. The dewlap of the male of this species is widest at its base and decreases in width over its entire length and terminates in a sharp point, as opposed to the distal expansion of the dewlap seen in Draco blanfordii. This feature may be shared with other Draco lizards. Both sexes have a thick, black transverse band that extends across the posterior gular region from one throat lappet to the other. Dark radial bands on the dorsal surface of the patagia of both sexes is also another feature.

It has a moderately slender body and the nostrils are orientated upwards. The dorsal surface is mottled brownish-grey with darker speckling. The patagium (winglike membrane) is dark brown near the edge and paler brown near the body, with six transverse pale-edged bands. The ventral surface is yellow or pinkish, with the gular pouch a creamy yellow anteriorly, and bluish-grey and black posteriorly. The underside of the patagium is yellowish-brown.

Distribution and habitat
Draco indochinensis is native to southeastern and eastern Cambodia and southern Vietnam. It is an arboreal species and seldom descends to the ground. Little is known of its diet and behaviour.

References

External links
Entry at the Comparative Toxicogenomics Database

indochinensis
Lizards of Asia
Reptiles of Cambodia
Reptiles of Vietnam
Reptiles described in 1928
Taxa named by Malcolm Arthur Smith